"Les Vendanges de l'amour" is a song by French singer Marie Laforêt. It initially appeared in 1963 on her EP titled Marie Laforêt (also called Les Vendanges de l'amour and Marie Laforêt vol. 1).

Composition 
The song was written by Danyel Gérard and Michel Jourdan.

Track listings 
7-inch EP Marie Laforêt (1963, Festival FX 45 1331, France)
A1. "Les Vendanges de l'amour" (2:37)
A2. "Tu fais semblant" (2:29)
B1. "Mary Ann" (3:01)
B2. "Les Jeunes Filles" (2:19)

7-inch single  (1963, Disques Festival FX 109, Italy)
 "La vendemmia dell'amore" ("Les vendanges de l'amour")
 "Che male c'è" ("Tu fais semblant")

7-inch EP Les Vendanges de l'amour / Viens sur la montagne / Le Lit de Lola / Katy cruelle (Musidisc VI 330, France)
A1. "Les Vendanges de l'amour" (2:25)
A2. "Le Lit de Lola" (2:43)
B1. "Viens sur la montagne" (Tell It on the Mountain) (2:20)
B2. "Katy cruelle"

Charts 
"Les Vendanges de l'amour"

References 

Marie Laforêt songs
1963 songs
1963 singles
Songs written by Danyel Gérard